The St. Helena Star is a weekly newspaper published in St. Helena, California, by Napa Valley Publishing Co., a  subsidiary of Lee Enterprises which also publishes the Napa Valley Register.  The newspaper was started in 1874.  The Star has a circulation of 2,500 and an online edition.  In 2011, the California Newspaper Publishers Association awarded it the 2nd place prize for 2010 in the "General Excellence" category for newspapers its size.

References 

Napa County, California
Newspapers published in the San Francisco Bay Area
St. Helena, California
1874 establishments in California
Newspapers established in 1874
Lee Enterprises publications
Weekly newspapers published in California